The People's Army is Loyal to the Party is a patriotic song composed by Zhang Yongmei and set to lyrics by Xiao Min.

It celebrates the role of the Chinese Communist Party and its founder Mao Zedong in the process of the founding and development of the Chinese Communist Party and the People's Liberation Army.

References

The People's Army is Loyal to the Party

Communism in China